The Geary River is a perennial river of the Corangamite catchment, located in the Otways region of the Australian state of Victoria.

Location and features
The Geary River rises in the Otway Ranges in southwest Victoria, near Parkers Spur, and flows generally east by south through the Port Campbell National Park before reaching its river mouth and emptying into Bass Strait, northeast of Cape Otway and south of the town of Marengo. From its highest point, the river descends  over its  course.

See also

References

External links

Corangamite catchment
Rivers of Barwon South West (region)
Otway Ranges